The Judicial Arrondissement of Eupen is a judicial arrondissement located in the Walloon Province of Liège, in Belgium. It comprises the 9 municipalities of the German-speaking Community. It is not an administrative arrondissement. All of its municipalities are a part of the Administrative Arrondissement of Verviers, which is divided into two judicial arrondissements.

German-speaking Community of Belgium
Eupen